Mislav Vrlić (born 4 April 1996) is a Croatian professional water polo player. He is currently playing for VK Primorje. He is 6 ft 6 in (1.99 m) tall and weighs 243 lb (110 kg). He started playing water polo at the age of 6. His older brother Josip is also water polo player.

References

External links

 Instagram
 Facebook
 Vaterpolist VK Primorja, Mislav Vrlić, posjetio je Specijalnu bolnicu Medico i našeg ortopeda prof. dr. sc. Radovana Mihelića.

1996 births
Living people
Croatian male water polo players